The men's 10,000 metres event was part of the track and field athletics programme at the 1920 Summer Olympics. The competition was held on Thursday, August 19, 1920, and on Friday, August 20, 1920. Thirty-four runners from 17 nations competed.

Records

These were the standing world and Olympic records (in minutes) prior to the 1920 Summer Olympics.

Results

Semifinals

All semi-finals were held on Thursday, August 19, 1920.

Semifinal 1

Semifinal 2

Semifinal 3

Final

The final was held on Friday, August 20, 1920.

References

Sources
 
 

10000 metres
10,000 metres at the Olympics